The 2014–15 New Mexico State Aggies men's basketball team represented New Mexico State University during the 2014–15 NCAA Division I men's basketball season. The Aggies, led by eighth year head coach Marvin Menzies, played their home games at the Pan American Center and were members of the Western Athletic Conference. They finished the season 23–11, 13–1 in WAC play to win the regular season WAC championship. They defeated Cal State Bakersfield and Seattle to be champions of the WAC tournament. They received an automatic bid to the NCAA tournament where they lost in the second round to Kansas.

Previous season 
The Aggies finished the season 26–10, 12–4 in WAC play to finish in second place. They were champions of the WAC tournament to earn an automatic bid to the NCAA tournament. In their 21st NCAA Tournament appearance, they lost in the second round to San Diego State.

Departures

Incoming Transfers

2014 Recruiting Class

Roster

Schedule

|-
!colspan=9 style=| Exhibition

|-
!colspan=9 style=| Non-Conference Regular season

|-
!colspan=9 style=| WAC Regular season

|-
!colspan=9 style=| WAC tournament

|-
!colspan=9 style=| NCAA tournament

References

New Mexico State Aggies men's basketball seasons
New Mexico State
New Mexico State
Aggies
Aggies